Calhoun Township is a township in Cheyenne County, Kansas, USA.  As of the 2000 census, its population was 57.

Geography
According to the USGS, it contains one cemetery, Barley.

Beaumaster Pond (historical) is within this township. The streams of Bluff Creek, Cleveland Run, Delay Creek, Hackberry Creek, Jones Canyon Creek, Nesbit Creek and Plum Creek run through this township.

References
 USGS Geographic Names Information System (GNIS)

External links
 US-Counties.com
 City-Data.com

Townships in Cheyenne County, Kansas
Townships in Kansas